Thomas Joseph Strada (born May 13, 1967), better known by his stage name Tommy Gunn, is an American pornographic actor and director. He has made several mainstream appearances, including an episode of Entourage and music videos for  Buckcherry and Rilo Kiley. In 2016, Gunn was inducted into the AVN Hall of Fame.

Early years
In his early years, Tommy grew interested in sports, BMX bicycles, motorcycles, and soccer. Gunn was shy around girls until he noticed girls were interested in bigger and "buffer" guys, so he took up bodybuilding. He entered a "hot body" contest in a local bar, and although he lost the contest, a man offered him work as a stripper. For ten years, he worked as a dancer, traveling all over the world.

Career

Beginning his career in pornographic films in 2004, Gunn was soon recognized as the 2005 AVN Best Male Newcomer award.  He likewise received the 2006 AVN Best Supporting Actor for his role in Pirates and a second AVN Male Performer of the Year for 2007.

In 2007, Gunn appeared in the music video for "The Moneymaker" by American indie rock band Rilo Kiley. He also appeared in the music video "Too Drunk" by the band Buckcherry. In 2010 Gunn appeared in an episode of Entourage. In 2011 he had an uncredited role in Mommy & Me, a comedy film, directed by Jennifer James. In 2012 he appeared in the Louis Theroux documentary Twilight of the porn stars discussing the porn industry and his personal experiences within it. In 2014, he appeared in the horror film Wolves, directed by David Hayter. He also had a small part in the 2017 movie Gangster land.

In 2009, Gunn directed and starred in a 3-D choose-your-own-adventure movie titled Cummin' At You 3D.

Gunn appeared in about 2,500 videos in his pornographic career.

Business ventures
In February 2012, he launched his own underwear line.

Gunn appeared in an episode of the History Channel show, Pawn Stars where he sold a "Zombie Apocalypse" vehicle for $11,000.

Personal life

Gunn's father is of Italian descent and his mother was half Chinese. He was married to porn actress Rita Faltoyano from 2005 to 2008. When asked during an August 2007 interview if there was a romance between him and fellow porn star Ashlynn Brooke, Gunn's reply was, "I think we are becoming something more." Gunn and Brooke have since ended their relationship.

Gunn has family in the Philadelphia area, including award-winning instructor of the ECCRSD Percussion Ensemble, Tom Harbora. Gunn had a zombie-proofed van, which he sold on the TV show Pawn Stars for  $11,000.

Awards and nominations

2005 AVN Award – Best Male Newcomer
2005 XRCO Award – New Stud
2006 AVN Award – Best Couples Sex Scene (Video) – Porn Star (with Brittney Skye)
2006 AVN Award – Best Supporting Actor (Video) – Pirates
2006 Eroticline Award – Best International Actor
2006 NightMoves Award – Best New Director (Fan's Choice)
2007 AVN Award – Best Group Sex Scene (Film) – FUCK (with Carmen Hart, Katsuni, Kirsten Price, Mia Smiles, Eric Masterson, Chris Cannon & Randy Spears)
2007 AVN Award – Best Oral Sex Scene (Film) – FUCK (with Ice LaFox, Eric Masterson, Marcus London & Mario Rossi)
2007 AVN Award – Best POV Sex Scene – Jack's POV 2 (with Naomi)
2007 AVN Award – Male Performer of the Year
2007 XRCO Award – Male Performer of the Year
2008 NightMoves Award – Best Male Performer (Fan's Choice)
2009 NightMoves Hall of Fame inductee
2011 NightMoves Award – Best Male Performer (Editor's Choice)
2011 XBIZ Award – Male Performer of the Year
2015 XBIZ Award – Best Scene - Couples-Themed Release  – Untamed Heart (with Anikka Albrite)
 2016 AVN Hall of Fame inductee
 2018 XBIZ Award - Best Sex Scene — Vignette Release - Sacrosanct

AVN Awards

Eroticline Awards

F.A.M.E. Awards

Hot d'Or

NightMoves Awards

XBIZ Awards

XRCO Awards

References

External links

 
 
 
 
 2006 FAME Awards hosting bio

1967 births
American male pornographic film actors
Living people
People from Cherry Hill, New Jersey
Pornographic film actors from New Jersey
American people of Italian descent
American male actors of Chinese descent
American pornographic film actors of Chinese descent